James W. Haviland (July 18, 1911 – November 14, 2007) was an American medical doctor and specialist in Internal Medicine co-founder of the University of Washington School of Medicine and co-founder of the Northwest Kidney Centers.

Haviland graduated from Johns Hopkins University in 1936. Haviland married twice, to Marion Bertram (d. 1993); Mary Katherine (Burden, 1st Marriage; Cook, Maiden Name) in 1997. Haviland had four children.

He died at his home in Bremerton, Washington on November 14, 2007 of natural causes.

References

External links

American nephrologists
University of Washington faculty
1911 births
2007 deaths
Members of the National Academy of Medicine